Broken spear may refer to:

Lance corporal, lancia spezzata, literally "broken lance" or "broken spear", the presumed origin of the rank
The Broken Spears: The Aztec Account of the Conquest of Mexico (Spanish title: Visión de los vencidos: Relaciones indígenas de la conquista), a book by Miguel León-Portilla, translating selections of Nahuatl-language accounts of the Spanish conquest of the Aztec Empire, first published in Spanish in 1959, and in English in 1962

See also
Broken Arrow (nuclear), an accidental event that involves nuclear weapons or nuclear components but which does not create the risk of nuclear war
Bent Spear, other nuclear weapons incidents that are of significant interest